C-type lectin domain family 2 member D is a protein that in humans is encoded by the CLEC2D gene.

This gene encodes a member of the natural killer cell receptor C-type lectin family. The encoded protein inhibits osteoclast formation and contains a transmembrane domain near the N-terminus as well as the C-type lectin-like extracellular domain. Several alternatively spliced transcript variants have been identified, but the full-length nature of every transcript has not been defined. CLEC2D encodes the gene for the Lectin Like Transcript-1 (LLT1) protein which is a functional ligand for the human NKR-P1A receptor, encoded by the KLRB1 gene.
In mice, there are many orthologs of the CLEC2D gene, and the presumed homolog is Clr-b/Ocil (Clec2d). Clr-b has been implicated in missing-self recognition by natural killer cells through engagement of the NKR-P1B receptor.

References

Further reading

External links